Märzen or Märzenbier is a lager that originated in Bavaria. It has a medium to full body and may vary in color from pale through amber to dark brown. It was the beer traditionally served at the Munich Oktoberfest. The geographical indication Oktoberfestbier is protected in the EU and can only be used for Märzen that is brewed in Munich.

History 

Märzen has its origins in Bavaria, probably before the 16th century. A Bavarian brewing ordinance decreed in 1553 that beer may be brewed only between 29 September (St. Michael's Day or Michaelmas) and 23 April (St. George's Day or Georgi), as the high temperatures required to heat and boil the ingredients in the kettle were more likely to cause fires or explosions during the hotter summer months.

Märzen was brewed in March, with more hops, malt and slightly higher alcohol content that would allow the beer to last while the brewing of new beer was forbidden from 24 April to 28 September.

The original Märzen was described as "dark brown, full-bodied, and bitter". The beer was often kept in the cellar until late in the summer, and bottles were served at the Oktoberfest.

Common names for Märzen in Germany and Austria include Märzenbier, Wiener Märzen, Festbier and Oktoberfestbier.

Märzen in Germany and Austria 
Märzen is now a rarity in Germany and is mainly found in the South, often in varieties that explicitly refer to its association with Oktoberfest, such as the "Oktoberfest Bier" from the Paulaner brewery. In Austria, however, Märzen is the name given to the most popular type of beer, but the Austrian Märzen is lighter in colour and taste and corresponds, more or less, to a Bavarian Helles or Export beer. The reason for this has to do with Austrian post-war regulations which limited the prices of essential food and drink products. Märzenbier was a preferred variety due to its reputation as a festive drink and its high pre-war price, but brewers reduced its malt and alcohol content in order to maintain its profitability at its newly limited price.

Description
In comparison to a Bavarian pale lager, the traditional Märzen style is characterized by a fuller body, and a sweeter and often less hoppy flavour. It typically contains 5.1-6.0% alcohol by volume.

The Austrian style is light in colour, body and flavour balance, and is the most popular beer style among the beers in Austria. Austrian Märzenbiers often use caramel malts that impart a sweeter flavour than their German counterparts; other Austrian Märzen overlap stylistically with Munich-style Helles.

Brewers in the Czech Republic also produce pale, amber and dark beers in the Märzen style, called respectively 14° Světlé Speciální Pivo (light special beer), Polotmavé Speciální Pivo (half-dark special beer), and Tmavé Speciální Pivo (dark special beer).

Żywiec, a Polish brewery, produces a Märzen style lager called piwo lager typu marcowe (March type lager beer), or simply "Marcowe".

See also
Helles
Pale lager

References

German beer styles